John William Warrington (2 November 1948 – 4 November 2022) was a New Zealand cricketer. He played first-class cricket for Auckland and Northern Districts between 1973 and 1976.

Warrington also played football for Birmingham City, Worcester City and Banbury United.

See also
 List of Auckland representative cricketers

References

External links
 

1948 births
2022 deaths
New Zealand cricketers
Auckland cricketers
Northern Districts cricketers
Cricketers from Coventry
Banbury United F.C. players
Worcester City F.C. players
Birmingham City F.C. players